Harrison Township is one of the twelve townships of Van Wert County, Ohio, United States.  The 2000 census found 1,085 people in the township.

Geography
Located in the western part of the county along the Indiana line, it borders the following townships:
Tully Township - north
Union Township - northeast corner
Pleasant Township - east
Liberty Township - southeast corner
Willshire Township - south
St. Marys Township, Adams County, Indiana - southwest
Union Township, Adams County, Indiana - west

No municipalities are located within Harrison Township.

Name and history
It is one of nineteen Harrison Townships statewide.

Government
The township is governed by a three-member board of trustees, who are elected in November of odd-numbered years to a four-year term beginning on the following January 1. Two are elected in the year after the presidential election and one is elected in the year before it. There is also an elected township fiscal officer, who serves a four-year term beginning on April 1 of the year after the election, which is held in November of the year before the presidential election. Vacancies in the fiscal officership or on the board of trustees are filled by the remaining trustees.

References

External links
County website

Townships in Van Wert County, Ohio
Townships in Ohio